The 1972 Canadian-American Challenge Cup was the seventh season of the Can-Am auto racing series.  It was contested by FIA Group 7 racing cars running two-hour sprint events.  The series began June 11, 1972, and ended October 29, 1972, after nine rounds. It was jointly sanctioned by the Sports Car Club of America and the Canadian Automobile Sports Club.

The series was won by George Follmer driving a Porsche 917/10 for Penske Racing.

Schedule

Season results

Drivers Championship
Points are awarded to the top ten finishers in the order of 20-15-12-10-8-6-4-3-2-1. For classification, the four best results of the first five races and all four results of the last four races were retained.

References

 
 

 
Can-Am seasons
Can-Am